The 2020 Oregon Republican presidential primary took place on May 19, 2020.

Results

See also
 2020 Oregon Democratic presidential primary

References

Republican primary
Oregon
Oregon Republican primaries